Micromidia convergens is a species of dragonfly in the family Austrocorduliidae,
known as the early mosquitohawk. 
It is a small to medium-sized, black to metallic green dragonfly with pale markings on its abdomen.
It is endemic to eastern Australia,
where it inhabits rainforest streams.

Gallery

Note
There is uncertainty about which family Micromidia convergens best belongs to: Austrocorduliidae, Synthemistidae, or Corduliidae.

See also
 List of Odonata species of Australia

References

Austrocorduliidae
Odonata of Australia
Endemic fauna of Australia
Taxa named by Günther Theischinger
Taxa named by J.A.L. (Tony) Watson
Insects described in 1978